Noriko Ishigaki (born Noriko Ogawa on August 1, 1974, in Miyagi Prefecture, Japan) is a Japanese politician who has served as a member of the House of Councillors of Japan since 2019. She represents the Miyagi at-large district and is a member of the Constitutional Democratic Party of Japan.

References 

Living people
1974 births
Politicians from Miyagi Prefecture
21st-century Japanese women politicians
Members of the House of Councillors (Japan)
Constitutional Democratic Party of Japan politicians
21st-century Japanese politicians